A Devil Under the Pillow is a 1968 Spanish-Italian film. It stars Ingrid Thulin, Maurice Ronet and Gabriele Ferzetti.

References

External links

1968 films
Italian comedy films
1960s Italian-language films
Spanish comedy films
French comedy films
1960s Italian films
1960s French films
Italian-language French films